The 2018 East–West Shrine Game was the 93rd staging of the all–star college football exhibition to benefit Shriners Hospital for Children. The game was played at Tropicana Field in St. Petersburg, Florida, on January 20, 2018, with a 3:07 PM EST kickoff; televised on the NFL Network. It was one of the final 2017–18 bowl games concluding the 2017 FBS football season. The game featured NCAA players (predominantly from the Football Bowl Subdivision) and a few select invitees from Canadian university football, rostered into "East" and "West" teams.

The game featured more than 100 players from the 2017 NCAA Division I FBS football season and prospects for the 2018 draft of the professional National Football League (NFL). In the week prior to the game, scouts from all 32 NFL teams attended team practices.

Coaches and game officials were supplied by the NFL. Head coaches in the game were assistant coaches with NFL teams who did not advance to the postseason; Jonathan Hayes of the Cincinnati Bengals for the East team, and Bobby Johnson of the Oakland Raiders for the West team.

The day before the game, the East–West Shrine Game Pat Tillman Award was given to J. T. Barrett (QB, Ohio State); the award "is presented to a player who best exemplifies character, intelligence, sportsmanship and service. The award is about a student-athlete's achievements and conduct, both on and off the field."

Coaching staffs

East team

Source:

West team

Source:

Players
Full roster is available here.

East team
Selected players are listed below. Full roster on the official website.

 Matthew Thomas opted not to play in the Independence Bowl

West team
Selected players are listed below. Full roster on the official website.

Game summary

Scoring summary

Source:

Statistics

Source:

See also
2018 NFL Draft

References

Further reading

External links
 Television promo (0:15) via YouTube
 Television promo (0:30) via YouTube
 NCAAF 2017 East West Shrine Game 20 01 2018 East vs West via YouTube

East West Shrine Game
East–West Shrine Bowl
American football in Florida
Sports competitions in St. Petersburg, Florida
January 2018 sports events in the United States
East-West Shrine Game